Alastor bucida is a species of wasp in the family Vespidae.

References

bucida
Insects described in 1853